Legend of the Ancient Sword is a Chinese fantasy-adventure-action film directed by Renny Harlin and based on the video game Gu Jian Qi Tan 2. The film was released worldwide on October 1, 2018.

Plot
Due to a fateful occurrence, Yue Wuyi leaves home. He meets revered master Xie Yi, who imparts to him the magical arts of Yan, and thus begins his journey of cultivation. Along the way he meets Wen Renyu, Xia Yize, Ah Ruan and company. They discover the schemes and conspiracies of Shen Ye, the grand priest of Liu Yue City. The group of adventurers undergoes dangers to defeat Shen Ye, and prevent a disaster from befalling the world.

Cast
Leehom Wang as Yue Wuyi 
Wu Jiacheng as young Yue Wuyi
Victoria Song as Wen Renyu 
Godfrey Gao as Xia Yize
Karena Ng as Ah Ruan 
Archie Kao as Xie Yi 
Julian Cheung as Chen Ye 
Ada Liu as Cang Ming
Li Yan as Nu Nu

Production
Principal photography began in December 2016 and wrapped up in March 2017.

Reception
The film was a box office disaster during China's golden week of cinema.  It attracted widespread derision online and only grossed US$1.25m despite a government mandate to screen the film nationwide.

References

External links

2018 films
2010s action adventure films
2010s fantasy adventure films
Films directed by Renny Harlin
Chinese action adventure films
Chinese fantasy adventure films
Alibaba Pictures films
Live-action films based on video games
Swords of Legends